William Greig (lived ca. 1812) was a Newcastle songwriter, who, according to the information given by W & T Fordyce (publishers) in “The Tyne Songster” published in 1840, has the song "A Parody Written On Hearing A Report That The Newcastle And Northumberland Yeomanry Cavalry Were To Be Disbanded" attributed to his name.

The song is sung to the tune of "The Soldiers Tear", It is not written in Geordie dialect but is definitely local to Newcastle.	

The same song appears in Songs of the Bards of the Tyne, published by P. France & Co. of Newcastle in 1840. The work appears on page 161 of this book edited by Joseph Philip Robson.

See also 					
Geordie dialect words				
The Tyne Songster (W & T Fordyce, 1840)				
W & T Fordyce (publishers)
France's Songs of the Bards of the Tyne - 1850
P. France & Co.
Joseph Philip Robson

External links
The Tyne Songster by W & T Fordyce 1840
Songs of the Bards of the Tyne

English songwriters
People from Newcastle upon Tyne (district)
Musicians from Tyne and Wear
Geordie songwriters
Year of birth missing
Year of death missing